Sungold Hill is a prominent round hill (860 m) with distinctive convex slopes, 2 nautical miles (3.7 km) inland between Cape Foster and Jefford Point on the south coast of James Ross Island. Named by United Kingdom Antarctic Place-Names Committee (UK-APC) following Falkland Islands Dependencies Survey (FIDS) surveys, 1958–61. The name records the characteristic color of the exposed rock cliffs.

Hills of Graham Land
Landforms of James Ross Island